E69 may refer to:
 European route E69
 King's Indian Defense, Encyclopaedia of Chess Openings code
 Shin-Tomei Expressway (Inasa Spur road) and San-en Nanshin Expressway, route E69 in Japan